Shimazuia is a genus of trematodes in the family Opecoelidae. It consists of one species, Shimazuia lethrini (Yamaguti, 1938) Cribb, 2005.

References

Opecoelidae
Plagiorchiida genera
Monotypic protostome genera